One Touch is an album by American saxophonistist Eric Marienthal released in 1993, and recorded for the GRP label. The album reached #11 on Billboard's contemporary Jazz chart.

Track listing
No Doubt About It (written by: Jeff Lorber / Eric Marienthal) - 4:33
That's The Way (Dave Koz / Kiki Ebsen / Randy Hall) - 4:00
One For James (Russell Ferrante / Jimmy Haslip) - 4:49
Walk Through The Fire (Jeff Lorber / Dave Koz / Allee Willis) - 5:24
Ouch! (Jeff Lorber / Eric Marienthal / Oliver Leiber) - 4:34
Westland (Jeff Lorber / Eric Marienthal) - 5:06
The Village (Russell Ferrante) - 5:59
Tanto Amor (Russell Ferrante / Ivan Lins) - 4:38
Backtalk (Eric Marienthal / Jimmy Earl / Jeff Lorber) - 3:54
Where Are You (David Benoit / Eric Marienthal) - 5:34

Personnel
Eric Marienthal - alto saxophone (1, 3, 4, 5, 6, 7, 9); soprano saxophone (2, 8, 10); tenor saxophone (3); baritone saxophone (3)
Dave Koz - soprano saxophone (2)
Paul Jackson, Jr. - guitar (1, 2, 4, 6, 9)
James Harrah - guitar (3, 7)
Oliver Leiber - guitar (5)
Peter Sprague - guitar (8)
Alec Milstein - bass (1, 2, 4, 5, 6, 9)
John Pattitucci - bass (1, 5: solos)
Jimmy Haslip - bass (3, 7, 8, 10)
Jeff Lorber - synthesizers, sequencing, drum programming (1, 2, 4, 5, 6, 9)
Russell Ferrante - piano, keyboards (3, 7, 8); sequence programming (3, 7)
David Benoit - piano, keyboard sequencing (10)
John Robinson - drums (3, 7, 10)
Paulinho Da Costa - percussion (1, 2, 4, 5, 6, 9)
Alex Acuña - percussion (7, 8, 10); drums (8)
Wayne Bergeron - trumpet (3)
Andy Martin - trombone (3)
Carl Anderson - vocals (4)
Ivan Lins - vocals (8)
Kiki Ebsen - background vocals (2)
Randy Hall - background vocals (2)
Benet - background vocals (4)

Charts

References

External links
Eric Marienthal/One Touch at Discogs
Eric Marienthal's Official Site

1993 albums
GRP Records albums